Elias Nelson Conway (May 17, 1812 – February 28, 1892) was an American politician and lawyer who served as the fifth governor of Arkansas from 1852 to 1860.

Early life
Conway was born in Greeneville, Tennessee. Born into a political family, Elias Nelson Conway was the younger brother of Henry Wharton Conway, who served as territorial delegate to several Congresses, and James Sevier Conway, who became the first governor of Arkansas when it was admitted as a state in 1836. Another brother, William Conway, served on the Arkansas Supreme Court.

When he was a boy, his family moved from Tennessee to Missouri. Conway attended Bonne Femme Academy in Boone County, Missouri. His older brother Henry died in 1827 as a result of a duel with a former friend, Robert Crittenden.

In 1833, Conway moved to Little Rock, Arkansas, where his older brothers had settled. He studied surveying. In 1835, he was appointed as the state auditor, and served until 1849.

Political career
In 1844, Elias Conway was offered, and declined, the Democratic nomination for governor. When offered the nomination again in 1852, he accepted. With a successful campaign, he was elected as Governor of Arkansas. He was reelected to a second term in 1856.

His administration focused on physical improvements to the state: roads and other infrastructure to encourage development. He formed the Chancery Courts and eased the state's financial problems. When Conway left office in 1860, the state treasury held a surplus.

Conway formed the Geological Survey of Arkansas, commissioning Principal Geologist David Dale Owen, to survey the territory west of Little Rock and provide a report on the area. The 'Natural Steps' were first written about and drawn by Owen, in his Second Report of a Geological Reconnaissance of the Middle and Southern Counties of Arkansas (1859).

Personal life
Conway was first cousin to Senator Ambrose Hundley Sevier and Governor Henry M. Rector.

Death
After Conway retired from public life, he became somewhat of a recluse he died at little rock. Conway is buried at the historic Mount Holly Cemetery in Little Rock, Arkansas.

See also
List of governors of Arkansas

References

External links
 Elias Nelson Conway Family
 
 Encyclopedia of Arkansas History & Culture entry: Elias Nelson Conway
 Memorial Foundation of the Germanna Colonies in Virginia, Inc.
 The Rector-Fishback-Conway-Sevier-Johnson Family

1812 births
1892 deaths
19th-century American politicians
Arkansas lawyers
Burials at Mount Holly Cemetery
Conway-Johnson family
Deaths in Arkansas
Democratic Party governors of Arkansas
People from Greeneville, Tennessee